Zamzam Abdi Aden is a Somali politician, who served as the Minister of Education and Science of Somaliland from July 2010 to February 2015, becoming the first female minister to hold this position. In February 2015, after a cabinet reshuffle she was appointed as Minister of Finance where she served until the end of Silanyo's administration. She was one of four ministers who served throughout Silanyo's administration from 2010 to 2017, along Saad Ali Shire, Mohamoud Hashi Abdi and Khalil Abdillahi Ahmed.

See also

 Ministry of Finance (Somaliland)
 Cabinet of Somaliland
 Ministry of Education and Science (Somaliland)

References

|-

Living people
Government ministers of Somaliland
Finance Ministers of Somaliland
Education Ministers of Somaliland
Somaliland politicians
Year of birth missing (living people)
Female finance ministers